Carlo Vittori (10 March 1931 – 24 December 2015) was an Italian sprinter and athletics coach. He competed in the men's 100 metres at the 1952 Summer Olympics. He was portrayed by Luca Barbareschi in the Italian RAI TV film  (2015).

Competition record

References

External links
 

1931 births
2015 deaths
Athletes (track and field) at the 1952 Summer Olympics
Italian athletics coaches
Italian male sprinters
Olympic athletes of Italy
Place of birth missing
Italian Athletics Championships winners